In college athletics in the United States, the National Collegiate Athletic Association (NCAA) has historically resisted efforts to compensate college athletes.  However, after years of effort by those in favor of student-athlete compensation, culminating in the Supreme Court's decision in NCAA v. Alston (2021), college athletes may now earn compensation for their name, image, and likeness (NIL).

History
The NCAA has long maintained that student-athletes cannot be compensated in the name of "amateurism." In 1953, the NCAA even created the term "student-athlete" in response to a Colorado state court's decision that a football player was an "employee" of the University of Denver. Despite further attempts by the NCAA to classify student-athlete compensation as a violation of the Commerce and Contracts Clauses of the U.S. Constitution, "amateurism" in college sports has begun to fade as the push for student-athlete compensation grows stronger.

The latest movement in the college athlete compensation space focuses on payment for name, image, and likeness, a practice first adopted by the State of California in 2019. Namely, in September, Governor Gavin Newsom signed Senate Bill 206, which generally allowed student-athletes in California to accept compensation for the use of their name, image, and likeness. The "Fair Pay to Play Act" bill was authored by California state senators Nancy Skinner and Steven Bradford and advanced with testimony from former Stanford volleyball star and 2015 national freshman of the year Hayley Hodson and Oklahoma State University football star Russell Okung. No federal statutes currently touch on this topic, and the only federal regulation permitting college students to accept compensation is 34 CFR § 675.16, which only relates to work-study programs.

However, the Supreme Court's recent decision in NCAA v. Alston sheds light on modern federal attitudes towards student-athlete compensation. In this case, the Court struck down any potential limitations on education-related benefits that student-athletes may receive. Most notably, the Court – and especially Justice Brett Kavanaugh – rejected the NCAA's "amateurism" argument as an overly broad and outdated defense for failing to allow its revenue-drivers (i.e., student-athletes) to receive compensation. The NCAA contended that the Court should defer to its amateurism model because it is a joint venture along with its member schools, but the Court instead reasoned that deference was inappropriate since the NCAA has a monopoly in the relevant market. The Court further rejected the NCAA's appeal that it was not a "commercial enterprise," noting the "highly profitable" and "professional" nature of certain college sports.

Shortly after the Court's decision in Alston, the NCAA issued an interim name, image, and likeness policy which permits student-athletes to earn this compensation. States have also followed suit by enacting similar laws. For example, Illinois Public Law 102-0042 permits athletes to receive market-value compensation for the use of their name, image, and likeness. Some scholars have noted the tax consequences that may arise from student-athlete compensation.

Several startups like ATHLYT have begun to connect advertisers with their student-athlete members shortly after the NCAA enacted their interim NIL policies. Grambling University signed what is believed to be one of the first NIL deals in 2022.

References

Further reading 
 

National Collegiate Athletic Association
College football controversies